Kaena: The Prophecy (French: Kaena: La prophétie) is a 2003 computer-animated fantasy adventure film. The United States release of the film is distributed by Destination Films and features the voices of Kirsten Dunst, Richard Harris (in his last role before his death), Anjelica Huston, Keith David and Ciara Janson.

Chris Delaporte started work on the film in 1995 after leaving at Éric Chahi's company Amazing Studio halfway through development of the Studio's only game Heart of Darkness. Originally intended as a video game, the project spun off into a film. There was, however, a tie-in video game produced.

Kaena was released theatrically in France by BAC Films on June 4, 2003. The film received generally negative reviews from critics, who criticized its story, although its animation was praised.

Plot
The film begins with an alien ship crash landing on a desert planet. The alien survivors, known as Vecarians, are quickly killed by the planet's predatory native inhabitants, the Selenites. The ship's core, Vecanoi, survives, and from it sprouts Axis, a massive tree reaching up into space.

600 years later, a race of human-like tree-dwellers have evolved living in the branches of Axis. One of them, a teenager named Kaena (voiced by Kirsten Dunst), is an adventurous daydreamer who longs to explore the world beyond the confines of her village. Kaena's inquisitiveness is opposed as heresy by the village elder, who commands his people to stay productive and toil for the villager's gods (who are, unbeknownst to them, the Selenites living in the planet below).

Led by prophetic dreams of a world with a blue sun and plentiful water, Kaena eventually defies the elder and climbs to the top of Axis. There, she encounters the ancient alien Opaz (voiced by Richard Harris), the last survivor of the Vecarian race that crash landed on the planet centuries ago. Opaz has used his technology to evolve a race of intelligent worms to serve him and help him escape the planet. Upon learning of Kaena's dreams, Opaz enlists her help in retrieving Vecanoi, which contains the collective memory of his people.

However, Vecanoi rests at the base of Axis, where the Selenites dwell. The Queen of the Selenites (voiced by Anjelica Huston) blames Vecanoi for the destruction of their planet, and has spent most of her life (and sacrificed the future of her people) attempting to destroy it.

Cast

French cast
 Cécile de France as Kaena
 Michael Lonsdale as Opaz
 Victoria Abril as La reine
 Jean Piat as Le prêtre

English cast
 Kirsten Dunst as Kaena
 Richard Harris as Opaz
 Anjelica Huston as Queen of the Selenites
 Keith David as Voxem
 Michael McShane as Assad
 Greg Proops as Gommy
 Tom Kenny as Zehos
 Tara Strong as Essy
 Dwight Schultz as Ilpo
 John DiMaggio as Enode
 Ciara Janson as Kamou, Roya
 Jennifer Darling as Reya
 Cornell John as Demok
 Gary Martin as The Priest
 William Attenborough as Sambo

Production
The project started as a video game in 1995.

Reception
Kaena was a box office bomb and earned highly negative reviews. The New York Times, Entertainment Weekly, The L.A. Times and The Boston Globe all said that it was lifeless and dull with an overly convoluted plot. There were unflattering comparisons to a much better-received French animated film, The Triplets of Belleville, and the similarly unsuccessful CG film Final Fantasy: The Spirits Within. A few nevertheless admired the visuals. The proportions of the main character drew comparisons to Lara Croft.

On Rotten Tomatoes, the film has an approval rating of 7% based on 30 reviews, with an average rating of 3.90/10. The site's critical consensus reads, "Though Kaena: The Prophecy is visually inventive, its story is incoherent, derivative, and dull." On Metacritic, the film has a score of 40 out of 100 based on 15 critics, indicating "mixed or average reviews".

References

External links

 
 
 

2003 films
2003 fantasy films
2003 science fiction films
2003 computer-animated films
2000s French animated films
2000s fantasy adventure films
2000s science fiction adventure films
2000s English-language films
2000s French-language films
Canadian computer-animated films
Canadian animated science fiction films
Canadian fantasy adventure films
Canadian science fiction adventure films
French computer-animated films
French animated science fiction films
French fantasy adventure films
French science fiction adventure films
Animated science fantasy films
English-language Canadian films
English-language French films
Animated films about extraterrestrial life
Films set on fictional planets
Animated films set in the future
Films produced by Marc du Pontavice
Xilam films
2000s Canadian films